Baker Barakat is a Kurdish boxer and kickboxer

Kickboxing record 

|-  bgcolor=#FFBBBB
| 2014-12-06 || Loss  ||align=left| Levan Guruli || Kickmas 2014, Semi Finals || Hamburg, Germany || Decision || 3 || 3:00
|-  bgcolor="#dddddd"
|-  bgcolor=#CCFFCC
| 2014-04-12 || Win ||align=left| Levan Guruli || Euskirchener Fight Night || Euskirchen, Germany  || TKO || 3 || 2:45
|-  bgcolor=#FFBBBB
| 2013-11-23 || Loss ||align=left| Artur Kyshenko || KOK World Grand Prix 2013 || Magdeburg, Germany || TKO || 1 || 2:04
|-  bgcolor=#CCFFCC
| 2013-09-07 || Win ||align=left| Waldemar Wiebe || Kampfsport Nacht Restart || Leverkusen, Germany || Decision || 3 || 
|-  bgcolor=#CCFFCC
| 2013-04-20 || Win ||align=left| Johanes Beausejour || Euskirchener Fight Night || Euskirchen, Germany || KO || 4 || 2:17
|-  bgcolor=#FFBBBB
| 2013-? || Loss ||align=left| Barnabas Szücs || Limani Fight Night || Hanau, Germany ||  || 5 || 
|-  bgcolor=#FFBBBB
| 2012-10-13 || Loss ||align=left| Atakan Arslan || Night of the Champions || Koblenz, Germany || Decision || 5 || 3:00
|-
! style=background:white colspan=9 |
|-
|-  bgcolor=#FFBBBB
| 2012-09-08 || Loss ||align=left| Gago Drago || Merseburger Fight Night 5 || Merseburg, Germany || Decision || 3 || 3:00
|-  bgcolor=#CCFFCC
| 2011-10-22 || Win ||align=left| Xeyal Ehmedov || K1 German League || Herne, Germany || Decision (unanimous)|| 5 || 3:00
|-  bgcolor=#CCFFCC
| 2011-08-28 || Win ||align=left| Alban Ahmeti || Merseburger Fight Night 4 || Merseburg, Germany || Decision (unanimous) || 3 || 3:00
|-  bgcolor=#CCFFCC
| 2011-08-28 || Win ||align=left| Egon Racz || Merseburger Fight Night 4 || Merseburg, Germany || Ext.R. Decision (unanimous)|| 3 || 3:00
|-  bgcolor=#FFBBBB
| 2010-11-20 || Loss ||align=left| Alisher Hasanov || Born to Fight || Eiskirchen, Germany || Decision || 5 || 3:00
|-  bgcolor=#CCFFCC
| 2010-10-02 || Win ||align=left| Rene Schick || Night of Champions 2010 || Wesseling, Germany || KO || 4 || 
|-  bgcolor=#CCFFCC
| 2010-09-05 || Win ||align=left| Dima Weimer || Humans Fight Night IV, Final || Hamburg, Germany || Decision (Majority) || 3 || 3:00
|-
! style=background:white colspan=9 |
|-
|-  bgcolor=#CCFFCC
| 2010-09-05 || Win ||align=left| Marco Piqué || Humans Fight Night IV, Semi Finals || Hamburg, Germany || Decision || 3 || 3:00
|-  bgcolor=#CCFFCC
| 2010-09-05 || Win ||align=left| Surnsuk || Humans Fight Night IV, Quarter Finals || Hamburg, Germany || TKO (Referee Stoppage) || 2 || 
|-  bgcolor=#CCFFCC
| 2010-04-03 || Win ||align=left| Fadi Merza || S-8 Thaiboxing || Wuppertal, Germany || Decision || 3 || 3:00
|-  bgcolor=#FFBBBB
| 2009-12-12 || Loss ||align=left| Mate Vundac || Backstreet Fights II || Cologne, Germany || Decision (Unanimous) || 5 || 3:00
|-  bgcolor=#FFBBBB
| 2009-09-13 || Loss ||align=left| Ramil Karmacaev || Humans Fight Night III, Semi Finals || Hamburg, Germany || Decision || 3 || 3:00
|-  bgcolor=#CCFFCC
| 2009-09-13 || Win ||align=left| Denis Oliwka || Humans Fight Night III, Quarter Finals || Hamburg, Germany || KO || 3 || 2:22
|-  bgcolor=#CCFFCC
| 2009-03-27 || Win||align=left| Thilo Schneider || Backstreet Fights || Cologne, Germany || TKO (3 Knockdowns) || 2 || 2:55
|-  bgcolor=#FFBBBB
| 2009-02-27 || Loss ||align=left| Adem Bozkurt ||  || Istanbul, Turkey || Decision || 3 || 3:00
|-  bgcolor=#CCFFCC
| 2009-? || Win||align=left| Hamilton Da Cruz Cardoso || Night of Champions || Wesseling, Germany || TKO (3 Knockdowns) || 4 || 
|-  bgcolor=#FFBBBB
| 2008-11-08 || Loss ||align=left| Elias Daniel || KlasH European Elimination 2008, Semi Finals || Hanau, Germany || Decision || 3 || 3:00
|-  bgcolor=#CCFFCC
| 2008-11-08 || Win ||align=left| Olli Koch || KlasH European Elimination 2008, Quarter Finals || Hanau, Germany || Decision || 3 || 3:00
|-  bgcolor=#CCFFCC
| 2008-10-11 || Win ||align=left| Ulli Schick || FIGHT THAI BOXING fight 9 World Cup  || Dorsten, Germany || KO || 1 || 0:55
|-  bgcolor=#FFBBBB
| 2008-05-03 || Loss ||align=left| Matthias Ibssa ||  || Utrecht, Germany || Decision || 5 || 3:00
|-  bgcolor=#FFBBBB
| 2007-10-13 || Loss ||align=left| Ogün Sesli || Euskirchen Fight Night IV || Euskirchen, Germany || Decision ||  || 
|-  bgcolor=#FFBBBB
| 2007-09-09 || Loss ||align=left| Nieky Holzken || Ultimate Glory 5 || Amersfoort, Netherlands || Decision || 3 || 3:00
|-  bgcolor=#FFBBBB
| 2007-06-23 || Loss ||align=left| Roberto Cocco || 5 Knockout Fight Night, Semi Final || Lucerne, Switzerland || Decision || 3 || 3:00
|-  bgcolor=#FFBBBB
| 2007-06-09 || Loss ||align=left| Mark Vogel || || Duisburg, Germany || Decision || 5 || 3:00
|-  bgcolor=#FFBBBB
| 2007-? || Loss ||align=left| Alban Ahmeti || || Regensburg, Germany || Decision || 5 || 3:00
|-
! style=background:white colspan=9 |
|-
|-  bgcolor=#FFBBBB
| 2006-11-25 || Loss ||align=left| Perry Ubeda || Knockin on Heavens Door|| Cologne, Germany || TKO ||  || 
|-  bgcolor=#FFBBBB
| 2006-10-14 || Loss ||align=left| Alviar Lima || || Germany || Decision || 5 || 3:00
|-  bgcolor=#CCFFCC
| 2006-09-16 || Win ||align=left| Alfredo Limonta ||  || Istanbul, Turkey || Decision || 3 || 3:00
|-  bgcolor=#FFBBBB
| 2006-09-15 || Loss ||align=left| Yavuz Oezden || A-1 Heat 2 || Istanbul, Turkey || Ext.R. Decision || 5 || 3:00
|-  bgcolor=#CCFFCC
| 2006-06-06 || Win ||align=left| Serkan Yılmaz || || Turkey || Ext.R. Decision || 4 || 3:00
|-  bgcolor=#CCFFCC
| 2006-05-06 || Win ||align=left| Dimar Weimar || Euskirchen Fight Night || Euskirchen, Germany ||  ||  || 
|-
! style=background:white colspan=9 |
|-
|-  bgcolor=#CCFFCC
| 2006-05-06 || Win ||align=left| Denis Dukanov || Euskirchen Fight Night || Euskirchen, Germany ||  ||  || 
|-  bgcolor=#CCFFCC
| 2006-05-06 || Win ||align=left| Ozecan Buwz || Euskirchen Fight Night || Euskirchen, Germany ||  ||  || 
|-  bgcolor=#FFBBBB
| 2004-11-20 || Loss ||align=left| Mirdi Limani ||  || Hanau, Germany || Decision || 5 || 3:00
|-
! style=background:white colspan=9 |
|-
|-  bgcolor=#FFBBBB
| 2004-04-24 || Loss ||align=left| Farid Villaume || European Muaythai Championship, Final || Woippy, France || TKO (2 Knockdowns) || 2 ||
|-  bgcolor=#FFBBBB
| 2004-03-20 || Loss ||align=left| Andrei Kotsur ||  || Germany || KO || 4 || 	
|-  bgcolor=#CCFFCC
| 2004-03-06 || Win ||align=left| Dimitar Iliev || Woippy 2004 Championnat d'Europe || Woippy, France || Decision || 5 || 3:00
|-  bgcolor=#FFBBBB
| 2004-02-29 || Loss ||align=left| George Pattison || Southern Kickboxing Promotions || Kent, United Kingdom || Decision (split) ||  ||
|-
! style=background:white colspan=9 |
|-
|-  bgcolor=#FFBBBB
| 2003-06-28 || Loss ||align=left| Farid Villaume || European Muaythai Championship, 2nd Round || Aubagne, France || KO || 1 ||
|-  bgcolor=#CCFFCC
| 2003-03-29 || Win ||align=left| Martin Karaivanov || Championnat d'Europe de Muay Thai || Paris, France || Decision  || 5 || 3:00
|-  bgcolor=#FFBBBB
| 2002-10-30 || Loss ||align=left| Sakmongkol Sithchuchok || || Abu Dhabi, UAE || Decision (unanimous) || 3 ||
|-  bgcolor=#CCFFCC
| 2002-10-30 || Win ||align=left| Ibrahim Camara || || Abu Dhabi, UAE || Decision (unanimous) || 3 || 
|-  bgcolor=#FFBBBB
| 2002-09-14 || Loss ||align=left| Vasily Shish || Knight of the KO || Sopot, Poland || KO || 3 || 
|-  bgcolor=#FFBBBB
| 2002-06-? || Loss ||align=left| Ali Gunyar ||  ||  ||  ||  || 
|-
! style=background:white colspan=9 |
|-
|-  bgcolor=#FFBBBB
| ? || Loss ||align=left| Albert Zimmerman || || || Decision || 3 || 3:00
|-  bgcolor=#CCFFCC
| ? || Win ||align=left| Tefik Sucu || || || Decision || 5 || 3:00
|-  bgcolor=#FFFFFF
| ? || ? ||align=left| Alex Vogel || || || Decision || 3 || 3:00
|-
| colspan=9 | Legend:

Boxing record 

|-
| style="text-align:center;" colspan="8"|40 wins (27 knockouts, 17 Losses , 4 Draws
|- style="text-align:center; margin:0.5em auto; font-size:95%; background:#e3e3e3;"
| style="border-style:none none solid solid; "|Res.
| style="border-style:none none solid solid; "|Record
| style="border-style:none none solid solid; "|Opponent
| style="border-style:none none solid solid; "|Type
| style="border-style:none none solid solid; "|Rd., Time
| style="border-style:none none solid solid; "|Date
| style="border-style:none none solid solid; "|Location
| style="border-style:none none solid solid; "|Notes
|- align=center
|Loss || 40-18-4 ||align=left| Michel Mothmora
|||  ||  ||align=left| 
|align=left| 
|- align=center
|Loss || 40-17-4 ||align=left| Tyron Zeuge
|||  ||  ||align=left| 
|align=left| 
|- align=center
|Win || 40-16-4 ||align=left| Remo Arns
|||  ||  ||align=left| 
|align=left|
|- align=center
|Loss || 39-16-4 ||align=left| Przemyslaw Opalach	
|||  ||  ||align=left| 
|align=left| 
|- align=center
|Win || 39-15-4 ||align=left| Remo Arns
|||  ||  ||align=left| 
|align=left|
|- align=center
|Loss || 38-15-4 ||align=left| Dimitri Sartison
|||  ||  ||align=left| 
|align=left|
|- align=center
|Win || 38-14-4 ||align=left| Remo Arns
|||  ||  ||align=left| 
|align=left|
|- align=center
|Loss || 37-14-4 ||align=left| George Groves
|||  ||  ||align=left| 
|align=left|
|- align=center
|Win || 37-13-4 ||align=left| Sabri Ulas Goecmen
|||  ||  ||align=left| 
|align=left|
|- align=center
|Loss || 36-13-4 ||align=left| Scott Dixon
|||  ||  ||align=left| 
|align=left|
|- align=center
|Loss || 36-12-4||align=left| Marcos Nader
|||  ||  ||align=left| 
|align=left|
|- align=center
|Win || 36-11-4 ||align=left| Khoren Gevor
|||  ||  ||align=left| 
|align=left|
|- align=center
|Win || 35-11-4 ||align=left| Amir Hacimuradov
|||  ||  ||align=left| 
|align=left|
|- align=center
|Win || 34-11-4 ||align=left| Sabri Ulas Goecmen
|||  ||  ||align=left| 
|align=left|
|- align=center
|Win || 33-11-4 ||align=left| Denis Tykanov
|||  ||  ||align=left| 
|align=left|
|- align=center
|Win || 32-11-4 ||align=left| Mounir Toumi
|||  ||  ||align=left| 
|align=left|
|- align=center
|Yes || 31-11-4 ||align=left| Turgay Uzun
|||  ||  ||align=left| 
|align=left|
|- align=center
|Win || 30-11-4 ||align=left| Remo Arns
|||  ||  ||align=left| 
|align=left|
|- align=center
|Win || 29-11-4 ||align=left| Achmed Kodar
|||  ||  ||align=left| 
|align=left|
|- align=center
|Win || 28-11-4 ||align=left| Michael Gensing
|||  ||  ||align=left| 
|align=left|
|- align=center
|Win || 27-11-4 ||align=left| Vadim Lebedev
|||  ||  ||align=left| 
|align=left|
|- align=center
|Win || 26-11-4 ||align=left| Chauki Harnasi
|||  ||  ||align=left| 
|align=left|
|- align=center
|Win || 25-11-4 ||align=left| Denis Tykanov
|||  ||  ||align=left| 
|align=left|
|- align=center
|Win || 24-11-4 ||align=left| Acun Fewen
|||  ||  ||align=left| 
|align=left|
|- align=center
|Win || 23-11-4 ||align=left| Ilhan Oezem
|||  ||  ||align=left| 
|align=left|
|- align=center
|Win || 22-11-4 ||align=left|  Frank Borchert
|||  ||  ||align=left| 
|align=left|
|- align=center
|Win || 21-11-4 ||align=left| Constantin Stavre
|||  ||  ||align=left| 
|align=left|
|- align=center
|Win || 20-11-4 ||align=left| Aras Taalo
|||  ||  ||align=left| 
|align=left|
|- align=center
|Loss || 19-11-4 ||align=left| Manuel Faisst
|||  ||  ||align=left| 
|align=left|
|- align=center
|Win || 19-10-4 ||align=left| Frank Borchert
|||  ||  ||align=left| 
|align=left|
|- align=center
|Win || 18-10-4 ||align=left| Constantin Stavre
|||  ||  ||align=left| 
|align=left|
|- align=center
|Win || 17-10-4 ||align=left| Achmed Kodar
|||  ||  ||align=left| 
|align=left|
|- align=center
|Win || 16-10-4 ||align=left| Marc Kuntz
|||  ||  ||align=left| 
|align=left|
|- align=center
|Win || 15-10-4 ||align=left| Mounir Toumi
|||  ||  ||align=left| 
|align=left|
|- align=center
|Win || 14-10-4 ||align=left| Michael Gensing
|||  ||  ||align=left| 
|align=left|
|- align=center
|Win || 13-10-4 ||align=left| Arthur Grzeschik	
|||  ||  ||align=left| 
|align=left|
|- align=center
|Loss || 12-10-4 ||align=left| Yavuz Ertuerk
|||  ||  ||align=left| 
|align=left|
|- align=center
|Win || 12-9-4 ||align=left| Acun Fewen
|||  ||  ||align=left| 
|align=left|
|- align=center
|win || 11-9-4 ||align=left| Denis Tykanov
|||  ||  ||align=left| 
|align=left|
|- align=center
|Win || 10-9-4 ||align=left| Michael Gensing
|||  ||  ||align=left| 
|align=left|
|- align=center
|Win || 9-9-4 ||align=left| Patrick Baumann
|||  ||  ||align=left| 
|align=left|
|- align=center
|Loss || 8-9-4 ||align=left| Michel Trabant
|||  ||  ||align=left| 
|align=left|
|- align=center
|Loss || 8-8-4 ||align=left| Cagri Ermis
|||  ||  ||align=left| 
|align=left|
|- align=center
|Loss || 8-7-4 ||align=left| Daniel Urbanski
|||  ||  ||align=left| 
|align=left|
|- align=center
|Win || 8-6-4 ||align=left| Vadim Lebedev
|||  ||  ||align=left| 
|align=left|
|- align=center
|Win || 7-6-4 || align=left| Mihalj Halas
|||  ||  ||align=left| 
|align=left|
|- align=center
|Loss || 6-6-4 ||align=left| Nick Klappert
|||  ||  ||align=left| 
|align=left|
|- align=center
|style="background:#abcdef;"|Draw || 6-5-4 ||align=left| Fabio Liggieri
||| ||  ||align=left| 
|align=left|
|- align=center
|Win|| 6-5-3 ||align=left| Guekkan Acar
|||  ||  ||align=left|  
|align=left|
|- align=center
|style="background:#abcdef;"|Draw || 5-5-3 ||align=left| Koko Murat
|||  ||  ||align=left| 
|align=left|
|- align=center
|Win || 5-5-2 ||align=left| Fikret Cikaric
|||  ||  ||align=left| 
|align=left|
|- align=center
|Win || 4-5-2 ||align=left| Agit Elmas
|||  ||  ||align=left| 
|align=left|
|- align=center
|Loss || 3-5-2 ||align=left| Roman Aramyan
|||  ||  ||align=left| 
|align=left|
|- align=center
|style="background:#abcdef;"|Draw || 3-4-2 ||align=left| Fatjon Murati
|||  ||  ||align=left| 
|align=left|
|- align=center
|Loss || 3-4-1 ||align=left| Andreas Reimer
|||  ||  ||align=left| 
|align=left|
|Win || 3-3-1 || Ommid Mostaghim
|||  ||  || 
|
|- align=center
|Win || 2-3-1 || Vadim Lebedev
|||  ||  ||align=left| 
|align=left|
|- align=center
|Loss || 1-3-1 ||align=left| Nico Schoepf
|||  ||  ||align=left| 
|align=left|
|- align=center
|Loss || 1–2-1 ||align=left| Ramzan Adaev
|||  ||  ||align=left| 
|align=left|
|- align=center
|Win || 1–1-1 ||align=left| Remy van Rees
|||  ||  ||align=left| 
|align=left|
|- align=center
|style="background:#abcdef;"|Draw || 0–1-1 || align=left| Sebastian Mollner
|||  ||  ||align=left| 
|align=left|
|- align=center
|Loss || 0–1 ||align=left| Vilmos Balog
|||  ||  ||align=left| 
|align=left|

Championships and awards

Boxing
World Boxing Union
World Boxing Union (German Version) super middleweight Champion

Kickboxing
Human Fight Night
Humans Fight Night IV 2010 Tournament Champion

References

German male kickboxers
Living people
1981 births
German male boxers
People from Al-Hasakah